

Players of the Week

Players of the Year

All-Conference Players

All-Americans

Academic All-Americans

National Award Winners

Attendance

Head coaches

David Stant, Keio

References

American football in Japan